The 2016 Speaker of the House of Representatives election was called to elect the new Speaker of the House of Representatives of the Netherlands after incumbent Anouchka van Miltenburg of the People's Party for Freedom and Democracy (VVD) had resigned on 12 December 2015. Van Miltenburg, who had been the Speaker since 25 September 2012, resigned after increasing criticism on her performance as Speaker. Khadija Arib of the Labour Party (PvdA), who had been a member of the House of Representatives from 1998 to 2006 and again since 2007, beat Ton Elias of the People's Party for Freedom and Democracy (VVD), who had been a member of the House since 2008.

Candidates
Four members of the House of Representatives declared their candidacy:
 Khadija Arib, member for the Labour Party (PvdA) since 2007.
 Martin Bosma, member for the Party for Freedom (PVV) since 2006.
 Ton Elias, member for the People's Party for Freedom and Democracy (VVD) since 2008.
 Madeleine van Toorenburg, member for the Christian Democratic Appeal (CDA) since 2007.

Results

References

External links

Official

  Voorzitter Tweede Kamer Parlement & Politiek
  Voorzitter Tweede Kamer der Staten-Generaal

2016 elections in the Netherlands
+